John Baines may refer to:
John Baines (Egyptologist) (born 1946), professor of Egyptology at the University of Oxford
John Baines (bobsledder) (born 1985), British bobsledder
John Baines (footballer) (born 1937), English footballer
John Baines (mathematician) (1787–1838), English mathematician

See also
John Baine (disambiguation)
John Bayne (disambiguation)
John Baynes (1758–1787), English lawyer and writer
John Baynes of the Baynes baronets